German submarine U-21 was a Type IIB U-boat of Nazi Germany's Kriegsmarine. Her keel was laid down 4 March 1936, by Germaniawerft of Kiel as yard number 551. She was commissioned on 3 August 1936. During World War II, she conducted operations against enemy shipping.

U-21 went on seven war patrols, sinking five ships, one auxiliary warship and damaging one warship.

Design
German Type IIB submarines were enlarged versions of the original Type IIs. U-21 had a displacement of  when at the surface and  while submerged. She had two shafts and two  propellers.

U-21 was fitted with three  torpedo tubes at the bow, five torpedoes or up to twelve Type A torpedo mines, and a  anti-aircraft gun. The boat had a complement of twentyfive.

Operational history

First, second and third patrols
U-21s first patrol was relatively uneventful.

On her second foray, the boat was attacked by the British submarine  which fired six torpedoes at her in the North Sea northeast of Berwick-Upon-Tweed [On the English/Scottish border] on 17 September 1939. These were the first submarine weapons launched by the Royal Navy in the Second World War. They all missed.

On her third patrol, the U-boat also had torpedoes fired at her in the central North Sea by another British submarine, . The result was inconclusive as well.

Fourth and fifth patrols
She also damaged the British cruiser  with a mine.

On her fifth sortie, she sank Mars on 21 December 1939 and Carl Henckel (both from Sweden), on the same day. She also sank the British boom defence vessel  in the Firth of Forth, again with a mine.

Sixth patrol

Seventh patrol
She sank the British Royal Archer with a mine on 26 February 1940, but then it all went horribly wrong on 27 March when she ran aground off Oldknuppen Island after a navigational error. The boat was towed to Mandal in Norway where she was interned. She was then towed to Kristiansand for repairs and released on 9 April after the German occupation of the Nordic country.

Fate
In July she was transferred to the 21st U-boat Flotilla in Kiel as a training boat, with whom she remained for the rest of the war. U-21 was scrapped in February 1945.

Summary of raiding history

References

Notes

Citations

Bibliography

External links
 
 

German Type II submarines
U-boats commissioned in 1936
World War II submarines of Germany
1936 ships
Ships built in Kiel
Grounded U-boats
Maritime incidents in March 1940